Warilla High School is a government-funded co-educational comprehensive secondary day school, located in Barrack Heights, a suburb of the City of Shellharbour, in the Illawarra region of New South Wales, Australia.

Established in 1965, the school caters for approximately 1,250 students in 2018, from Year 7 to Year 12, of whom eight percent identified as Indigenous Australians and 16 percent were from a language background other than English. The school is operated by the NSW Department of Education.

Overview 
The school is located in the suburb of Barrack Heights and there were suggestions of renaming the school to reflect the change in primary feeder schools (Flinders Public School, Warilla Public School, Shellharbour Public School, and Barrack Heights Public School). In early to late 2009 Warilla High underwent a major reconstruction with the funding of six new Science Labs. The school celebrated its 50th anniversary in 2015.

As of 2010 Warilla High School had an enrolment of over 1,200 students making it one of the largest high schools in the region.

Principals
The following individuals has served as principal of Warilla High School.

See also 

 List of government schools in New South Wales
 List of schools in Illawarra and the South East (New South Wales)
 Education in Australia

References

External links 
 

Public high schools in New South Wales
Schools in Wollongong
1965 establishments in Australia
Educational institutions established in 1965
City of Shellharbour